Events in the year 1955 in China. The country had an estimated population of 605 million people.

Incumbents
 Chairman of the Chinese Communist Party: Mao Zedong
 President of the People's Republic of China: Mao Zedong
 Premier of the People's Republic of China: Zhou Enlai
 Chairman of the National People's Congress: Liu Shaoqi
 Vice President of the People's Republic of China: Zhu De
 Vice Premier of the People's Republic of China: Chen Yun

Governors  
 Governor of Anhui Province: Zeng Xisheng then Huang Yan
 Governor of Fujian Province: Ye Fei  
 Governor of Gansu Province: Deng Baoshan
 Governor of Guangdong Province: Tao Zhu
 Governor of Guizhou Province: Zhou Lin
 Governor of Hebei Province: Lin Tie 
 Governor of Heilongjiang Province: Han Guang  
 Governor of Henan Province: Wu Zhipu 
 Governor of Hubei Province: Liu Zihou then Zhang Tixue 
 Governor of Hunan Province: Cheng Qian 
 Governor of Jiangsu Province: Tan Zhenlin then Hui Yuyu 
 Governor of Jiangxi Province: Shao Shiping 
 Governor of Jilin Province: Li Youwen 
 Governor of Liaoning Province: Du Zheheng
 Governor of Qinghai Province: Sun Zuobin
 Governor of Shaanxi Province: Zhao Shoushan
 Governor of Shandong Province: Kang Sheng then Zhao Jianmin
 Governor of Shanxi Province: Pei Lisheng 
 Governor of Sichuan Province: Li Jingquan then Li Dazhang
 Governor of Yunnan Province: Chen Geng then Guo Yingqiu 
 Governor of Zhejiang Province: Tan Zhenlin then Sha Wenhan

Events
 Continuing Kuomintang Islamic insurgency in China
 January 18 to January 20 - Battle of Yijiangshan Islands
 January 19 to February 26 - Battle of Dachen Archipelago
 January 29 - Formosa Resolution of 1955
 April 11 - Kashmir Princess
 until May 1 - First Taiwan Strait Crisis
 August - Start of the Sufan movement
 September–November Bumper rice and wheat crop

Other events
 July - Opening of Taizhou Luqiao Airport
 Opening of the Chongqing Zoo
 Completion of the Sino-Soviet Friendship Building, in Shanghai

Other establishments
 Pingshi Prison
 Shushan Prison
 Sunan Shuofang International Airport

Education
 Establishments:
 Beijing University of Posts and Telecommunications
 China Foreign Affairs University
 Chongqing Communication Institute
 Chongqing No.1 Middle School
 Guangdong Institute of Education
 Zhongyuan University of Technology

Sports
 Establishment of Jilin FC

Births 

 Li Qiang
 Mai Cheng
 Yang Yumin
 Lu Ke
 Ding Lieyun
 Jing Yidan
 Wang Jiasheng

Deaths 

 Hong Shen
 Huang Binhong
 Shi Dongshan

See also
 1955 in Chinese film

References

 
1950s in China
Years of the 20th century in China